is a yaoi manga series written by Yugi Yamada. It has been adapted into an OVA directed by Tama. It is licensed in North America by Digital Manga Publishing, which published the first volume in 2006.

Plot 
After being best man at his best friend's (Saitou Toshihisa) wedding, Nagai Atsushi realizes that he might never be with the man he loves, Saitou. Nagai, drowning in his sorrows and hatred for the new bride then meets Honda Kenzou, another guest at the wedding, a friend of the bride's. Honda took care of Nagai when he was dead drunk and now Nagai thinks he may have feelings for both men. Things start to get complicated when Saitou's bride runs off with another man and Saitou starts hitting on Nagai.

Voice Actors 
 Nagai Atsushi voiced by Kenichi Suzumura
 Saitou Toshihisa voiced by Kouichi Toochika
 Honda Kenzou voiced by Toshiyuki Morikawa

Staff 
 Director: Tama
 Storyboard: Tama
 Original Creator: Yugi Yamada
 Character design: Takepon
 Animation director: Takepon
 Sound Director: Tomohiro Yoshida

Reception

Ed Chavez, writing for Mania Entertainment, described Yamada's character designs for her salarymen characters as being differentiated through "unique expressions and body language".

References

External links
 Library Journal review
 Comics village review
 Juné Manga official page
 
 

2001 manga
2007 anime OVAs
Comedy-drama anime and manga
Digital Manga Publishing titles
Hentai anime and manga
Yaoi anime and manga